MTV Music was a 24-hour Australian and New Zealand subscription music channel which first launched on 3 December 2013.

History
On 29 October 2013, MTV announced they had been working with Foxtel since early 2013 to offer more diversity on the Foxtel platform, as their two current music dedicated channels – MTV Classic and MTV Hits – fought for the same audience as Foxtel Networks channels MAX and [V] Hits respectively. As such, it was decided that MTV Classic and MTV Hits would cease broadcasting on the Foxtel platform to be replaced by two new MTV channels. The channel to replace MTV Hits was MTV Music, the same name of the number one UK music channel, which will feature pop, rock, urban and alternative music.

On 1 January 2014, MTV Music launched on Australian IPTV provider FetchTV. On 1 December 2015, a localized version of MTV Music launched in New Zealand on Sky Television, replacing both MTV Classic and MTV Hits. On 30 November 2016, MTV Music moved from channel 808 to 803 on the Foxtel platform. On 1 July 2020, the channel rebranded back to MTV Hits, as part of a wider deal between Foxtel and ViacomCBS. MTV Hits now broadcasts on Foxtel channel 801, taking the slot of the former Channel [V].

Logo history

Programs 
They are automated blocks of hit music videos at all. And similar to MTV Dance, MTV Music only broadcasts three 5-minute commercial breaks each hour.
 Night Shift
 #MTVBattle
 Toasty Tunes
 MTV On The Go
 MTV Official Top 30
 On Demand x20
 Throwback Tracks
 Hungry, Hungry Hits
 Upload of the Week
 Hot af x10
 MTV Artists Only
 MTV Doodles
 What's New?
 Must See Vids x10
 MTV's Most Played x30/x40
 Homegrown Hits
 That's So Nineties
 Official Aria Chart x20/x10/x40
 Back to...
 U. S. A. x30
 30 Most Downloaded
 MTV House Party
 MTV Upload
 #TFIF
 MTV Likes
 21 Under 21
 Indie Mixtape
 MTV Upload Encore
 A to Zedd on MTV
 RnB x Hip Hop
 Legit Hits
 MTV Asia Hits
 Can't Get You Out of My Head
 OK Danceoke
 100% Pop Classics

See also
 Club MTV (Australian TV channel)
 NickMusic (Australian TV channel)

References

External links

MTV channels
Music video networks in Australia
Music video networks in New Zealand
English-language television stations in Australia
Defunct television channels in Australia
English-language television stations in New Zealand
Defunct television channels in New Zealand
Television channels and stations established in 2013
Television channels and stations disestablished in 2020